The following is a list of places in Montana.

A

B

C

D

E

F

G

H

I

J

K

L

M

N

O

P

Q

R

S

T

U

V

W

Y

Z

See also
List of cities and towns in Montana
List of counties in Montana
List of ghost towns in Montana

External links

State of Montana website

Populated places in Montana
Places
Montana